The Household Finance and Consumption Survey (HFCS) is a statistical survey conducted by the Central Statistics Office (CSO) on behalf of the Central Bank of Ireland as part of the European Central Bank (ECB) Household Finance and Consumption Network (HFCN).

The HFCS is designed to collect household-level data on households’ finances and consumption, and is required by all Eurozone countries to facilitate comparable data analysis for the Euro area as a whole.

Household Finance and Consumption Survey 2013 

The 2013 HFCS study was the first conducted in Ireland, carried out between March and September 2013 with 5,419 respondent households.

Results of the 2013 study were released in January 2015 by the Central Statistics Office.

Survey data is available on the CSO website in PDF format.

Methodology and scope 

The 2013 study sample size consisted of 5,419 respondent households.

The survey collected a range of household information from the adults taking the survey, including the following household characteristics at micro level:

 demographics
 real and financial assets
 liabilities
 consumption and saving
 income and employment
 future pension entitlements, intergenerational transfers and gifts
 attitudes to risk

Main uses and aims 

The HFCS is designed to find out more about household finance and consumption in Ireland.

HFCS aims to collect information to help policy-makers respond to a variety of questions concerning:

 Debt and financial pressures
 Portfolio choice and demand for assets
 Saving, liquidity constraints and the smoothing of consumption
 Computational finance

External links 
 Central Statistics Office
 Household Finance and Consumption Network (HFCN) (official) website
 Central Bank of Ireland

References 

Economy of the Republic of Ireland
Economic data
Panel data
Household income